The Royal Conservatory of Music (RCM), branded as The Royal Conservatory, is a non-profit music education institution and performance venue headquartered in Toronto, Ontario, Canada. It was founded in 1886 by Edward Fisher as The Toronto Conservatory of Music. In 1947, King George VI incorporated the organization through royal charter. Its Toronto home was designated a National Historic Site of Canada in 1995, in recognition of the institution's influence on music education in Canada. Tim Price is the current Chair of the Board, and Peter Simon is the President.

History

Early history

The conservatory was founded in 1886 as The Toronto Conservatory of Music and opened in September 1887, located on two floors above a music store at the corner of Dundas Street (Wilton Street) and Yonge Street (at today's Yonge Dundas Square). Its founder Edward Fisher was a young organist born in the United States. The conservatory became the first institution of its kind in Canada: a school dedicated to the training of singers and musicians, and also to instilling a love of music in young children. In its first year, it hired Italian musician and composer Francesco D'Auria to teach at the conservatory.

The conservatory's initial intake was just over 100, and by its second quarter this number had grown to nearly 300 as its reputation quickly spread. In 1897, the organization purchased a new property at College Street and University Avenue (now site of the Intact Centre) to accommodate its rapid expansion. From its earliest days, it was affiliated with the University of Toronto with the purpose of preparing students for degree examinations and shared its premises with the University of Toronto, Faculty of Music from 1919.

In 1906, Frank Welsman – who became the principal of the conservatory – founded and directed the Toronto Conservatory Orchestra, which became the Toronto Symphony Orchestra two years later.

Toronto College of Music and Canadian Academy of Music
The period between 1918 and 1924 witnessed a series of mergers among music conservatories in Toronto.  The Toronto College of Music was founded in 1888 by conductor F.H. Torrington, and became the first music conservatory affiliated with the University of Toronto. After Torrington's death in 1917, the school merged with the Canadian Academy of Music in 1918. The Academy itself had been founded in 1911 by Albert Gooderham, who financed the school out of his own personal fortune and served as the school's only president during its 13-year history.  The Academy, in turn, merged into the Toronto Conservatory of Music in 1924.

Post-war growth
Glenn Gould – arguably the conservatory's most outstanding pupil – studied theory, organ, and piano, graduating at the age of 12 in 1946 with an ARCT diploma of the highest honours.

In 1947, King George VI awarded the conservatory its royal charter in recognition of its status as one of the Commonwealth's greatest music schools. The Toronto Conservatory of Music became The Royal Conservatory of Music.

During Ettore Mazzoleni's term as principal (1945–68), the conservatory grew rapidly. Mazzoleni had been director of the Conservatory Orchestra since 1934. Two other prominent figures who contributed to the achievements of this period were chairman of the board Edward Johnson (who served from 1947 to 1959) and Arnold Walter, who was appointed director of the new Senior School in 1946. The Senior School offered a two-year program with professional performance training combined with related courses in theory and history. The initial success of the project gave rise to a three-year program leading to an Artist Diploma, as well as the conservatory's Opera School (begun in 1946), which provided training in all aspects of opera production. These developments led to the creation of the Royal Conservatory Opera Company, which went on to become the Canadian Opera Company in 1959.

With space now a major problem, the University of Toronto sold the College Street property to Ontario Hydro in 1962 (demolished to make way for the Ontario Power Building in 1975), and the conservatory moved to 273 Bloor Street West, the original site of McMaster University or McMaster Hall as well as Castle Memorial Hall. The concert and recital halls of the College Street site were only partially replaced in the move, and the library, residence, and all three pipe organs were lost.

Independent institution
The conservatory was governed by the University of Toronto from 1963 until 1991, at which time it became a wholly independent institution again, taking control of its building and diverse music programs. Peter Simon was appointed president of the conservatory.

Also in 1991, the conservatory developed a master plan to renovate its historic building and expand it with the construction of new facilities on the same site. The plan was carried out by Kuwabara Payne McKenna Blumberg Architects (KPMB) in stages, initially with the 1997 renovation of Mazzoleni Concert Hall in the historic Ihnatowycz Hall. The plans for this renovation are held at the Canadian Centre for Architecture in Montreal. The new construction is named the TELUS Centre for Performance and Learning and features academic and performance spaces; the acoustically sound, 1,135-seat Koerner concert venue; studios; classrooms; a new-media centre; a library; and a rehearsal hall. During the renovations, the conservatory temporarily moved to the former location of the Toronto District School Board's Ursula Franklin Academy in the Dufferin and Bloor West area. In September 2008, the conservatory returned to a newly renovated and expanded headquarters at 273 Bloor Street West near Avenue Road. Koerner Hall opened on 25 September 2009, beginning a new age of large-scale performances at The Royal Conservatory.

The original building, McMaster Hall, was renamed Ihnatowycz Hall in 2005, in reference to the contribution of alumni Ian Ihnatowycz and Marta Witer. The designation of this site as a heritage building required that the majority of the original materials and formal qualities be maintained while complying with the building code. The original brickwork was maintained: decorative red brick, Medina sandstone, and polished granite. The imposing manner of the building demonstrates the prominent form of the building.

Arts education programs
The Royal Conservatory is a not-for-profit organization offering a wide range of arts programs.

The Royal Conservatory Certificate Program
This is the division of The Royal Conservatory that sets and supports standards in music examinations across Canada and internationally. The organization conducts 100,000 examinations annually in over 300 communities around the world.

Examinations are conducted three or four times each year in more than 300 communities through a network of local centres. The Certificate Program encompasses all levels and spans 11 grades: from beginner to certification as an Associate of The Royal Conservatory of Music (ARCT), to certification as a Licentiate of The Royal Conservatory of Music (LRCM).

Achievement on the examinations of The Royal Conservatory is recognized for credit toward secondary school graduation in many school systems in Canada. For most provinces in Canada, a Level 6 Certificate and Level 6 Theory (formerly Intermediate Rudiments) counts as Grade 10 credit, a Level 7 Certificate and Level 6 or Level 7 Theory (also formerly Intermediate Rudiments) counts as Grade 11 credit, and a Level 8 Certificate and Level 8 Theory (formerly Advanced Rudiments) counts as Grade 12 credit. One's standing in the Certificate Program also plays an important role in entrance requirements for professional music programs at many universities and colleges.

The Royal Conservatory Music Development Program
In 2011 The Royal Conservatory partnered with Carnegie Hall to launch The Achievement Program in the United States. In January 2013 The Royal Conservatory took on sole responsibility of the successful program under the name The Royal Conservatory Music Development Program. Developed to provide a national standard for all learners, in 2016 The Music Development Program was merged with The RCM Certificate Program.

The Frederick Harris Music Co., Limited

The Frederick Harris Music Co. Limited, is the oldest and largest print-music publisher in Canada.

Frederick Harris (1866–1945) devoted his life to music publishing. He began his career in England working for a large music publishing firm. In 1904, he set up his own business in London and in 1910, established a Canadian office in Toronto – marking the beginning of a long association with The Royal Conservatory that led to an increased emphasis on publications for teaching and learning.
In 1944, the company was donated to the conservatory with profits to be used for its own purposes.

The Glenn Gould School

A centre for professional training in classical music performance at the postsecondary and postbachelor levels, The Glenn Gould School was established in 1987. Originally called The Royal Conservatory of Music Professional School, it was renamed in 1997 to honour Glenn Gould, the Toronto-born piano virtuoso and a former pupil. Enrollment is limited to 130, and The School is supported by funding from the Department of Canadian Heritage through the National Arts Contribution Program. It has become one of the most highly-respected music conservatories in North America, and the world.

The faculty consists of internationally acclaimed performers, teachers, and scholars. More than 125 master classes are presented each year with artists, such as Leon Fleisher, Stewart Goodyear, Anton Kuerti, and James Ehnes.

Glenn Gould School alumni have established careers as solo performers, orchestral musicians, chamber musicians, and recording artists. Alumni include the pianist Jan Lisiecki, singers Isabel Bayrakdarian and Robert Gleadow, the pianists David Jalbert and Richard Raymond, the harpist Mariko Anraku, the violist Adam Romer, as well as the St. Lawrence String Quartet.

The Glenn Gould School offers an accredited four-year Bachelor of Music (Honours) degree in Music Performance in piano, voice, and all orchestral instruments, designed for high school graduates who wish to prepare for a career as a performer. The Artist Diploma is a two-year postbachelor program for piano, voice, orchestral instruments, performance, and pedagogy.
 The school also offers The Rebanks Family Fellowship and Performance Diploma Program, a one-year career development program for aspiring classical musicians.

The Phil and Eli Taylor Performance Academy for Young Artists
After a competitive audition and interview, accepted students are streamed into Junior, Intermediate, or Senior Academy programs. This comprehensive program develops performance skills, musicianship, and academic excellence. Most Academy activities take place on Friday evenings and Saturdays but students are expected to practice daily and work on regular assignments. Through the support of private individuals and foundations, financial assistance is available for all students. Alumni of the Academy who have launched successful careers include Peter Simon, Katie Stillman, Eugene Nakamura, Marcin Swoboda, Janice LaMarre, Marta and Irena Kretchkovsky, and Karen Ouzounian.

Royal Conservatory School
The Royal Conservatory School offers individual and group instruction in classical, popular, folk, jazz, and world music, to people of all ages and abilities. 
The school also offers music appreciation sessions as well as training programs for teachers and artists.

The Marilyn Thomson Early Childhood Education Centre

In October 2013 The Royal Conservatory launched The Marilyn Thomson Early Childhood Education Centre, with an aim of spreading online learning in music to young children.

Exchange Program
The Royal Conservatory of Music’s Glenn Gould School has joined the exchange program with different prestigious music institutions across the world. 
The exchange institutions include: 
  Conservatoire National Supérieur de Musique et de Danse de Paris, France;
  Shanghai Conservatory of Music, China;
  Sibelius Academy of the University of the Arts Helsinki, Finland;
  Hochschule für Musik Hanns Eisler Berlin, Germany;
  The Hong Kong Academy for Performing Arts, Hong Kong;
  Sydney Conservatorium of Music, Australia;
  Reina Sofía School of Music Munich, Germany;
  Reina Sofía School of Music, Madrid Spain;
  Tokyo University of the Arts, Faculty of Music, and Graduate School of Music, Japan;
  London’s Royal Academy of Music, England.

Performing arts

The Royal Conservatory presents approximately 100 performances a year, featuring classical, jazz, world, and pop music artists from around the world. It has three concert venues: Koerner Hall, Mazzoleni Concert Hall, and Temerty Theatre.

Koerner Hall
Named for donors Michael and Sonja Koerner, Koerner Hall opened in September 2009 and houses 1,135 seats. It was designed by KPMB Architects, under the direction of Marianne McKenna, theatre consultant Anne Minors Performance Consultants, and acoustics company Sound Space Design. It features two balcony tiers above the main orchestra level as well as a third technical balcony. Koerner Hall's signature element is an acoustically transparent veil of twisting oak strings that forms the backdrop for the chorus at the first balcony level, then hovers over the stage below the fixed acoustic canopy, extending into and over the hall at the technical balcony level. Completion of the project also includes three tiers of glass fronted lobbies overlooking Philosopher's Walk, back-of-house areas for performers, a ground-floor café, and installation of a unique collection of antique musical instruments donated by the Koerner family and valued at $1 million. Each level is also equipped to host a variety of private functions.

Mazzoleni Concert Hall
Mazzoleni Concert Hall has  and 237 seats. When it opened in 1901, it was known as Castle Memorial Hall. At that time it had a chapel with stained glass windows on the ground floor level and a library on the lower level. By the 1960s, the University of Toronto, which used the space as a lecture hall, had bricked up the windows and removed a rear balcony. In 1996, restoration began. Mazzoleni Concert Hall was named in honour of Ettore Mazzoleni, a former principal of the conservatory.

Temerty Theatre
"A granite cube which floats above Bloor Street," this multipurpose performance and event space is located on level 2 of the TELUS Centre for Performance and Learning. It has space for up to 150 seats and is designed to accommodate a range of functions, including special events, performance, rehearsals, and "Learning Through the Arts™" activities. In scale and proportion, the Conservatory Theatre replicates the acoustic quality and stage size of Koerner Hall to prepare students for live performance. The venue is named in honour of James and Louise Temerty.

ARC Ensemble
Established in 2002, the ARC Ensemble (Artists of The Royal Conservatory) is composed of senior faculty members of the conservatory's Glenn Gould School in Toronto and led by artistic director Simon Wynberg.

The ensemble has been nominated for three Grammy Awards. Its current album, dedicated to the works of Polish-American composer Jerzy Fitelberg, was nominated in the categories of Best Chamber Music Performance and Producer of the Year, Classical (David Frost). The ensemble has also received Grammy nominations for its 2007 recording On the Threshold of Hope, and its 2008 album Right Through The Bone, devoted to the music of German-Dutch composer Julius Röntgen.

Current membership

 Marie Berard, violin
 Benjamin Bowman, violin
 Steven Dann, viola
 Bryan Epperson, cello
 David Louie, piano
 Erika Raum, violin
 Joaquin Valdepeñas, clarinet
 Dianne Werner, piano

Alumni

Randy Bachman, guitarist
Rob Baker, guitarist
Emilie-Claire Barlow, jazz singer and musician
Isabel Bayrakdarian, soprano
Jeanne Beker, television personality
Mario Bernardi, conductor
Laila Biali, singer, songwriter, and pianist
Mary Bothwell, classical vocalist (Canadian Academy of Music)
Russell Braun, baritone
Measha Brueggergosman, soprano
Howard Cable, conductor and composer
The Rt. Hon. Kim Campbell, 19th Prime Minister of Canada
Kim Cattrall, actor
Piya Chattopadhyay, broadcaster and journalist
Jane Child, singer 
Bruce Cockburn, singer, songwriter, and guitarist
Jonathan Crow, violinist, concert master
George Crum, conductor
John Cuciurean, music theorist, composer, guitarist
Mychael Danna, Academy Award-winning composer
John Estacio, composer
Bob Ezrin, record producer
Ivan Fecan, media executive
David Foster, musician, producer, and composer
George Gao, erhu player and composer
Eric Genuis, composer and pianist
Wallis Giunta, mezzo-soprano 
Chilly Gonzales, Grammy Award-winning pianist, songwriter, and producer
Glenn Gould, pianist
Robert Goulet, singer and actor
Lawrence Gowan, pianist
Barbara Gowdy, novelist, short-story writer
Gryphon Trio
Emily Haines, singer/songwriter
Stuart Hamilton, pianist, vocal coach, radio broadcaster, artistic director, and producer
Rt. Hon Stephen Harper 22nd Prime Minister of Canada
Jeff Healey, guitarist
Angela Hewitt, pianist
Heather Hiscox, journalist and broadcaster
Leslie Holmes, baritone and voice teacher (Canadian Academy of Music)
Scott Houghton, Pianist, Doctor, Motorcycle Enthusiast
Carly Rae Jepsen, singer/songwriter
Norman Jewison, film director
Kiesza, Singer, songwriter, and multi-instrumentalist
Carolyn Dawn Johnson, singer/songwriter
Eli Kassner, guitar teacher
Norbert Kraft, classical guitarist
Diana Krall, singer and pianist
Chantal Kreviazuk, singer/songwriter, pianist
Julian Kuerti, conductor
Gary Kulesha, conductor, composer, and faculty at the University of Toronto, Faculty of Music
Robert, now Bobbi Lancaster, pianist cum medical doctor and professional golfer
Gordon Lightfoot, singer/songwriter
Jens Lindemann, trumpeter
Jan Lisiecki, pianist
Alexina Louie, composer, pianist
Ann-Marie MacDonald, author
Amanda Marshall, singer/songwriter
Lois Marshall, soprano
The Hon. Barbara McDougall, former Secretary of State for External Affairs
Loreena McKennitt, singer, pianist and composer
Sarah McLachlan, singer/songwriter
Sean Morley, wrestler
Geoffrey Moull, conductor and pianist
Kent Nagano, conductor and music director
Scott Niedermayer, hockey player
Phil Nimmons, composer and educator
Roger Norrington, conductor
Sandra Oh, award-winning actress
Joseph Pach, violinist
Owen Pallett, violinist and composer
Jon Kimura Parker, pianist and educator
Richard Reed Parry, guitarist and composer
Ryan Peake, guitarist
Oscar Peterson, pianist and composer
Adrianne Pieczonka, soprano
Gordon Pinsent, actor
Sarah Polley, filmmaker and actress
Kalan Porter, singer/songwriter
Tegan and Sara Quin, singers, songwriters, and pianists
Eric Radford, world champion pairs figure skater
The Hon. Bob Rae, former premier of Ontario
Erika Raum, violinist
Ryan Reynolds, actor
Doug Riley, composer and pianist
John Robertson, composer
R. Murray Schafer, composer and educator
Paul Shaffer, musical director
Mitchell Sharp, Canadian former Minister of Finance
Sarah Slean, singer/songwriter
St. Lawrence Quartet, string quartet
Teresa Stratas, soprano
George Stroumboulopoulos, broadcaster
Shania Twain, singer
Veronica Tennant, filmmaker and former Prima Ballerina, National Ballet of Canada
Jon Vickers, tenor
Rafael Villanueva, music director
Greg Wells, Grammy winning musician, composer, record producer

Teachers
Notable teachers at The Royal Conservatory include:
Joan Barrett violin teacher
Boris Berlin, pianist, arranger, and composer
Leon Fleisher, pianist and conductor
Arthur Friedheim, pianist, conductor and composer (Canadian Academy of Music)
Nicholas Goldschmidt, first music director of conservatory's Opera School (1946-1957)
Alberto Guerrero, teacher (1922-1959)
Paul Kantor, violin teacher
Luigi von Kunits, conductor
Ernest MacMillan, principal (appointed 1926)
Boyd Neel, dean of the conservatory, 1953–1971
Laura de Turczynowicz (1878–1953), former opera singer and head of the Royal Conservatory Opera Company 1926–1928
Frank Welsman, conductor, pianist, composer and music educator
Healey Willan, appointed head of the theory department in 1913, vice-principal, 1920–1936

Honorary Fellows of The Royal Conservatory

An Honorary Fellowship is the highest honour awarded by The Royal Conservatory. It is presented to outstanding Canadian and international artists and individuals who have made significant contributions to arts and culture in Canada and around the world.

1990: John Kruspe, musician and lecturer
1990: Norman Burgess, musician, educator, administrator
1991: Gordon Kushner, pianist, conductor, and teacher
1992: William Littler, educator and music and dance critic at the Toronto Star
1993: Robert Goulet
1993: J Anthony Dawson, organist, composer, and teacher at The Royal Conservatory
1993: Adrienne Clarkson, journalist and stateswoman
1994: Lois Marshall, soprano and mezzo-soprano
1994: Robertson Davies, author
1995: David Mirvish, art collector and dealer
1995: Maureen Forrester, operatic contralto who gave master classes at the conservatory
1996: Mario Bernardi, conductor and pianist
1997: Lorand Fenyves, violin teacher
1997: Doreen Hall, violinist, teacher to the conservatory
1998: Jeanne Lamon, violinist and conductor
1998: Tomson Highway, writer
1999: Teresa Stratas, soprano
1999: Marina Geringas, publisher at the conservatory
1999: Alan Goddard, former director of The Royal Conservatory of Music
2000: Edith Lantos, educator
2000: Leon Fleisher, pianist and conductor
 2000: Aline Chrétien
 2001: Richard Bradshaw, conductor
 2001: Oscar Peterson, pianist
 2002: Eugene Kash, violinist, conductor, and teacher
 2002: David Foster, producer, songwriter, and composer
2003: Richard Margison, operatic tenor
2003: Bruce Cockburn, singer/songwriter
2004: Isabel Bayrakdarian, soprano
2004: Barenaked Ladies, rock band
2005: Louise Pitre, actress
2005: Bramwell Tovey, conductor and composer
2006: The Tragically Hip, rock band
2007: Erica Davidson, ballet dancer
2007: Marta Witer, optometrist
2007: Ian O. Ihnatowycz, investor
2007: Blue Rodeo, pop and country band
2008: John Perry, pianist
2008: Steven Staryk, violinist
2008: R. Murray Schafer, composer, writer, educator
2008: Nelly Furtado, singer/songwriter
2010: Darren Entwistle, businessman
2011: Jeanne Lougheed and Peter Lougheed, philanthropist and Premier of Alberta
2011: Jens Lindemann, trumpeter
2011: June Goldsmith, artistic director
2011: Phil Nimmons, composer and educator
2011: Marianne McKenna, founding partner, KPMB Architects
2012: Henry Lee, business leader and philanthropist
2012: Joseph Elworthy, arts administrator
2012: Stephen McHolm, arts administrator
2012: Martin Beaver, violinist
2012: Judy Loman, harpist
2012: Gerald Stanick, violist, teacher, and arts administrator
2012: Measha Brueggergosman, soprano
2012: Feist, singer/songwriter
2013: Jeremiah Brown, Olympic medallist
2013: Dr. Stephen Toope, scholar and administrator
2013: Victor Feldbrill, conductor
2013: The Hon. Tommy Banks, pianist, composer, television personality, and former senator
2013: Doc Severinsen, jazz and pop trumpeter
2013: Bob Ezrin, music producer
2013: Adrianne Pieczonka, soprano
2013: Randy Bachman, guitarist
2014: Andrew Markow, music teacher
2014: Paul Dornian, arts administrator and music teacher
2014: Jean MacPhail, music teacher
2014: Phil and Eli Taylor, philanthropists
2014: Sir Andrew Davis, conductor
2014: Ron Sexsmith, singer/songwriter
2015: Bill van der Sloot, music teacher
2015: Kathryn Walker, arts administrator
2015: Tania Miller, conductor
2015: Mary Morrison, soprano and music teacher
2015: Chris Hadfield, astronaut
2015: Mario Romano, philanthropist
2015: James Ehnes, violinist
2015: Buffy Sainte-Marie, singer/songwriter
2016: Michael Foulkes
2016: Chantal Kreviazuk, singer/songwriter
2016: W. Garfield Weston Foundation
2016: Jon Kimura Parker, pianist
2016: k.d. lang, singer/songwriter
2016: Lang Lang, pianist
2017:Russell Braun, baritone
2017: Ben Heppner, tenor
2017: Henry Hung, philanthropist
2017: Burton Cummings, singer/songwriter
2018: Denise Ball, journalist and producer
2018: Robbie Robertson, singer/songwriter
2018: Sondra Radvanovsky, soprano
2018: Tim and Frances Price, philanthropists
2018: Linda Niamath, music educator
2019: Lighthouse, rock band
2019: Anagnoson & Kinton, piano duo
2019: BMO Financial Group, philanthropy
2019: Stephen Chatman, composer
2019: Eric Radford, figure skater
2020: Stewart Goodyear, pianist

See also

 List of Canadian organizations with royal patronage
 List of oldest buildings and structures in Toronto
 Music of Canada
 Music of Ontario
 The Prince's Charities

References

Further reading

External links

 Official website

 
Classical music in Canada
Music schools in Canada
Education in Toronto
Organizations based in Canada with royal patronage
Educational institutions established in 1886
Music venues in Toronto
Concert halls in Canada
1886 establishments in Ontario